The sanctions against Iraq were a comprehensive financial and trade embargo imposed by the United Nations Security Council (UNSC) on Iraq. They began August 6, 1990, four days after Iraq's invasion of Kuwait, stayed largely in force until May 22, 2003 (after Saddam Hussein's being forced from power), and persisted in part, including reparations to Kuwait. The original stated purposes of the sanctions were to compel Iraq to withdraw from Kuwait, to pay reparations, and to disclose and eliminate any weapons of mass destruction (WMD). In December 2021, Iraq's central bank announced that it had paid off its entire debt of $52 billion in war reparations to Kuwait.

The UNSC imposed stringent economic sanctions on Iraq by adopting and enforcing United Nations Security Council Resolution 661 in August 1990. Resolution 661 banned all trade and financial resources with both Iraq and occupied Kuwait except for medicine and "in humanitarian circumstances" foodstuffs, the import of which was tightly regulated. In April 1991, following Iraq's defeat in the Gulf War, Resolution 687 lifted the prohibition on foodstuffs, but sanctions remained in effect with revisions, including linkage to removal of weapons of mass destruction.

Despite the provisions of Resolution 706, Resolution 712, and Resolution 986, the UN and the Iraqi government could not agree on the terms of an Oil-for-Food Programme (OFFP), which effectively barred Iraqi oil from the world market for several years. When a memorandum of understanding was finally reached in 1996, the resulting OFFP allowed Iraq to resume oil exports in controlled quantities, but the funds were held in escrow and the majority of Iraq's purchases had to be individually approved by the "Iraq Sanctions Committee," composed of the fifteen members of the UNSC. (Additionally, some funds were withheld for Kuwaiti reparations.) The sanctions regime was continually modified in response to growing international concern over civilian harms attributed to the sanctions; eventually, all limitations on the quantity of Iraqi oil exports were removed (per Resolution 1284), and a large proportion of Iraqi purchases were pre-approved (per Resolution 1409), with the exception of those involving dual-use technology. In later years, Iraq manipulated the OFFP to generate hard currency for illegal transactions, while some neighboring countries began to ignore the sanctions entirely, contributing to a modest economic recovery. By reducing food imports, the sanctions appear to have played a role in encouraging Iraq to become more agriculturally self-sufficient, although malnutrition among Iraqis was nevertheless reported.

The effects of the sanctions on the civilian population of Iraq have been disputed. Whereas it was widely believed that the sanctions more than doubled the child mortality rate, research following the 2003 US-led invasion of Iraq has shown that commonly cited data were doctored by the Saddam Hussein regime and that "there was no major rise in child mortality in Iraq after 1990 and during the period of the sanctions". Nevertheless, sanctions contributed to a significant reduction in Iraq's per capita national income, especially prior to the introduction of the OFFP. Most UNSC sanctions since the 1990s have been targeted rather than comprehensive, a change partially motivated by concerns that the Iraq sanctions had inflicted disproportionate civilian harm.

Prior calls to sanction Iraq
The Reagan administration generally supported Iraq during the Iran–Iraq War, despite Iraq's extensive use of chemical weapons against post-revolutionary Iran. In response to reports of further Iraqi chemical attacks against its Kurdish minority after the end of the war with Iran, in September 1988 United States (U.S.) senators Claiborne Pell and Jesse Helms called for comprehensive economic sanctions against Iraq, including an oil embargo and severe limitations on the export of dual-use technology. Although the ensuing legislation passed in the U.S. Senate, it faced strong opposition within the House of Representatives and did not become law. Several U.S. commercial interests with ties to Iraq lobbied against sanctions, as did the State Department, despite Secretary of State George Shultz's public condemnation of Iraq's "unjustified and abhorrent" chemical attacks. According to Pell in October 1988: "Agricultural interests objected to the suspension of taxpayer subsidies for agricultural exports to Iraq; the oil industry protested the oil boycott—although alternative supplies are readily available. Even a chemical company called to inquire how its products might be impacted."

Administration
As described by the United Nations (UN), the United Nations Security Council (UNSC) Resolution 661 imposed comprehensive sanctions on Iraq following that country's August 1990 invasion of Kuwait. These sanctions included strict limits both on the items that could be imported into Iraq and on those that could be exported. UN Resolutions 660, 661, 662, 664, 665, 666, 667, 669, 670, 674, 677, 678 and 687 expressed the goals of eliminating weapons of mass destruction (WMD) and extended-range ballistic missiles, prohibiting any support for terrorism, and forcing Iraq to pay war reparations and all foreign debt.

Limitations on imports
When the Oil-for-Food Programme (OFFP) allowed Iraq to resume exporting oil in 1996, the resulting revenue was held in escrow; Iraq had to ask the "Iraq Sanctions Committee" (i.e., the fifteen members of the UNSC) to individually approve its purchases, with "foodstuffs and certain medical, health and agricultural materials exempt from review" according to the United States Department of State. (Additionally, some of the revenue was redirected for other purposes, notably reparations to Kuwait.) In May 2002 the process was streamlined by Resolution 1409, which established a "Goods Review List" for dual-purpose items. From then on, all other Iraqi purchases were automatically approved, while the listed items were reviewed separately.

Enforcement of sanctions
Enforcement of the sanctions was primarily by means of military force and legal sanctions. Following the passage of Security Council Resolution 665, a Multinational Interception Force was organized and led by the U.S. to intercept, inspect and possibly impound vessels, cargoes and crews suspected of carrying freight to or from Iraq.

The legal side of sanctions included enforcement through actions brought by individual governments. In the U.S., legal enforcement was handled by the Office of Foreign Assets Control (OFAC). For example, in 2005 OFAC fined Voices in the Wilderness $20,000 for gifting medicine and other humanitarian supplies to Iraqis without prior acquisition of an export license as required by law.

Effectiveness
There is a general consensus that the sanctions achieved the express goals of limiting Iraqi arms. For example, U.S. Under Secretary of Defense Douglas J. Feith says that the sanctions diminished Iraq militarily. According to scholars George A. Lopez and David Cortright: "Sanctions compelled Iraq to accept inspections and monitoring and won concessions from Baghdad on political issues such as the border dispute with Kuwait. They also drastically reduced the revenue available to Saddam, prevented the rebuilding of Iraqi defenses after the Persian Gulf War, and blocked the import of vital materials and technologies for producing WMD." Saddam told his Federal Bureau of Investigation (FBI) interrogator that Iraq's armaments "had been eliminated by the UN sanctions."

Oil-for-Food Programme

As the humanitarian impact of the sanctions became a matter of international concern, several UN resolutions were introduced that allowed Iraq to trade its oil for approved goods such as food and medicine. The earliest of these, Resolution 706 of 15 August 1991, allowed the sale of Iraqi oil in exchange for food, which was reaffirmed by Resolution 712 in September 1991. The UN states that "The Government of Iraq declined these offers". As a result, Iraq was effectively barred from exporting oil to the world market for several years.

In April 1995, an Oil-for-Food Programme (OFFP) was formally created under Security Council Resolution 986, but the resolution could not be implemented until Iraq signed a Memorandum of Understanding (MOU) with the UN in May 1996. Under the OFFP, the UN states that "Iraq was permitted to sell $2 billion worth of oil every six months, with two-thirds of that amount to be used to meet Iraq's humanitarian needs. In 1998, the limit on the level of Iraqi oil exports ... was raised to $5.26 billion every six months, again with two-thirds of the oil proceeds to be earmarked to meet the humanitarian needs of the Iraqi people." In later iterations of the OFFP (pursuant to the December 1999 Resolution 1284), there were no restrictions on Iraq's oil exports and the share of revenue allocated to humanitarian relief increased to 72%; 25% of the proceeds (which were held in escrow) were redirected to a Kuwaiti reparations fund, and 3% to UN programs related to Iraq. The first shipments of food arrived in March 1997, with medicines following in May 1997. The UN recounts that "Over the life of the Programme, the Security Council expanded its initial emphasis on food and medicines to include infrastructure rehabilitation". The UN, rather than the Iraqi government, administered the OFFP in Iraq's Kurdistan Region.

While the OFFP is credited with improving the conditions of the population, it was not free from controversy. The U.S. State Department criticized the Iraqi government for inadequately spending the money. In 2004–2005, the OFFP became the subject of major media attention over corruption, as allegations surfaced that Iraq had systematically sold oil vouchers at below-market prices in return for some of the proceeds from the resale outside the scope of the programme; investigations implicated individuals and companies from dozens of countries. In 2005, a UN investigation led by Paul Volcker found that the director of the OFFP, Benon Sevan, personally accepted $147,184 in bribes from Saddam's government, which Sevan denied.

By the late 1990s, the Iraqi economy showed signs of modest growth, which would continue until 2003: Iraq's gross domestic product increased from US$10.8 billion in 1996 to US$30.8 billion in 2000. The OFFP was the major factor in this growth, as it led to the inflow of hard currency, which helped reduce inflation. (Another factor was illegal transactions, as many countries began to simply ignore the sanctions.) While internal and external trade was revitalized, this did not lead to a significant increase in the standard of living for the majority of the population; on the contrary, the government tried to prevent benefits from flowing to Shi'ite areas in southern Iraq to persuade more countries to oppose the sanctions. In 2000, the national income per capita was estimated to be US$1,000—less than half of what it had been in 1990, according to Robert Litwak.

Effects on the Iraqi people during sanctions
High rates of malnutrition, lack of medical supplies, and diseases from lack of clean water were reported during the sanctions. In 2001, the chairman of the Iraqi Medical Association's scientific committee sent a plea to The BMJ to help it raise awareness of the disastrous effects the sanctions were having on the Iraqi healthcare system.

Thomas Nagy argued in the September 2001 issue of The Progressive magazine that U.S. government intelligence and actions in the previous ten years demonstrates that the U.S. government had acted to intentionally destroy Iraq's water supply. Michael Rubin criticized Nagy for "selective" use of sources and argued that "the documentary evidence eviscerates Nagy's conclusions," opining that "if Saddam Hussein's government has managed to spend more than $2 billion for new presidential palaces since the end of the Persian Gulf War, and offer to donate nearly $1 billion to support the Palestinian intifada, there is no reason to blame sanctions for any degradation in water and sanitation systems."

Denis Halliday was appointed UN Humanitarian Coordinator in Baghdad, Iraq as of 1 September 1997, at the Assistant Secretary-General level. In October 1998 he resigned after a 34-year career with the UN in order to have the freedom to criticise the sanctions regime, saying "I don't want to administer a programme that satisfies the definition of genocide." However, Sophie Boukhari, a UNESCO Courier journalist, reports that "some legal experts are skeptical about or even against using such terminology" and quotes Mario Bettati for the view that "People who talk like that don't know anything about law. The embargo has certainly affected the Iraqi people badly, but that's not at all a crime against humanity or genocide."

Halliday's successor, Hans von Sponeck, subsequently also resigned in protest, calling the effects of the sanctions a "true human tragedy". Jutta Burghardt, head of the World Food Program in Iraq, followed them.

Impact on agriculture
Throughout the Ba'ath Party's rule over Iraq, the agricultural sector had been under-performing. Those in the U.S. who supported sanctions believed that low agricultural production in Iraq (coupled with sanctions) would lead to "a hungry population", and "a hungry population was an unruly one". The Iraqi government, which understood the serious effects the sanctions could have on Iraq, was able to increase agricultural output by 24 percent from 1990 to 1991. During the sanction years, the agricultural sector witnessed "a boom of unprecedented proportions". Iraq's Revolutionary Command Council (RCC) introduced several decrees during this period to increase agricultural performance. These decrees may be separated into three categories:
They introduced severe penalties on farmers (or landowners) unable to produce at full capacity on their land.
Government programs made it cheaper (and therefore more profitable for farmers and landowners) to produce.
Programs were initiated to increase the amount of arable land.

The RCC introduced Decree No. 367 in 1990, which stated that all lands which were not under production by their owners would be taken over by the state; if the owner could not use all of the land he owned, he would lose it. However, the RCC's policy was not "all stick and no carrot". The government made it easier for farmers and landowners to receive credit. On 30 September 1990, the Ministry of Agriculture announced that it would increase loans to farmers by 100 percent, and would subsidize machinery and tools. In October 1990, the RCC stated it was planning to utilize and exploit "every inch of Iraqi arable land". While official statistics cannot be trusted entirely, they showed massive growth in arable land: from 16,446 donums in 1980 to 45,046 donums in 1990. In turn, irrigation projects were launched to meet the increased demand for water in Iraq's agricultural sector. The increase in agricultural output does not mean that hunger was not widespread; prices of foodstuffs increased dramatically during this period. However, overall the sanctions failed and (indirectly) led to an unprecedented improvement in agriculture, creating a constituency of farmers in central Iraq who had a vested interest in the sanctions remaining in effect. Data from 1990 is also consistent with the observation that destruction wrought by the 1991 Gulf War may be more responsible than the sanctions themselves for reducing Iraq's capacity to increase food production further.

Joseph Sassoon commented on Iraq's successful use of food rationing to mitigate the effects of sanctions and war, suggesting that Iraq's government was not wholly lacking in competence or efficiency despite being portrayed as such by critics.

Estimates of deaths due to sanctions
Estimates of excess deaths during the sanctions vary widely, use different methodologies and cover different time frames. The figure of 500,000 child deaths was for a long period widely cited, but recent research has shown that that figure was the result of survey data manipulated by the Saddam Hussein regime.

A 1995 The Lancet estimate put the number of excess deaths of children under the age of five at 567,000, based on a small sample size Food and Agriculture Organization (FAO) survey conducted in Baghdad with Iraqi government interviewers that found a child mortality rate of around 200 deaths per 1000 births—several times larger than the previously reported rate. When Sarah Zaidi, one of the study's coauthors, carried out follow-up surveys in 1996 and 1997 with Jordanian interviewers, "many of the deaths were not confirmed in the reinterviews. Moreover, it emerged that some miscarriages and stillbirths had been wrongly classified as child deaths in 1995." The child mortality rate suggested by Zaidi's 1996 survey (38 per 1000) was less than one-fifth that of the 1995 figure (206 per 1000). Zaidi remained concerned about humanitarian conditions in Iraq, but forthrightly acknowledged a problem of replication, hypothesizing at the time that "an accurate estimate of child mortality in Iraq probably lies between the two surveys." She later told Michael Spagat: "My guess is that 'some' Iraqi surveyors recorded deaths when they did not take place or the child had died outside the time frame but they specified the opposite."

A more detailed and seemingly more credible 1999 UNICEF study called the "Iraq Child and Maternal Mortality Survey" (ICMMS), using survey data from nearly 40,000 households again collated by Iraqi government field workers (except in the autonomous Kurdistan Region), calculated that roughly 500,000 children had died as a result of sanctions, based on the assumption that the child mortality rate had more than doubled from 56 deaths per 1000 births (during 1984–1989) to 131 deaths per 1000 births (during 1994–1999). Notably, the ICMMS found a steady decline in the child mortality rate after 1992 in areas where data was collected by Kurdish, rather than Iraqi government, interviewers. Limited child mortality data from Iraq's 1997 census was inconsistent with some ICMMS findings, and, much later, a 2017 study in The BMJ described "the rigging of the 1999 Unicef survey" as "an especially masterful fraud". The three comprehensive surveys (using full birth histories) that have been conducted since 2003—namely, the 2004 Iraq Living Conditions Survey (ILCS), which was initially discounted by the Volcker Committee for finding far fewer child deaths than expected, and the Multiple Indicator Cluster Surveys (MICS) carried out by UNICEF and Iraq's Ministry of Health (MOH) in 2006 and again in 2011—all found that the child mortality rate in the period 1995–2000 was approximately 40 per 1000, which means that there was no major rise in child mortality in Iraq after sanctions were implemented. As a corollary, "there was no major improvement in child mortality" as a result of the 2003 invasion of Iraq, contrary to claims made by some of its proponents. Despite disproving its 1999 study in 2006 and 2011, UNICEF never formally disavowed the ICMMS results (or released the survey's underlying data to the public); however, the UN revised its official child mortality figures for Iraq to match the corrected data.

Controversies

Culpability
Scholar Ramon Das, in the Human Rights Research Journal of the New Zealand Center for Public Law, examined each of the "most widely accepted ethical frameworks" in the context of violations of Iraqi human rights under the sanctions, finding that "primary responsibility rests with the UNSC" under these frameworks, including rights-utilitarianism, moral Kantianism, and consequentialism. By contrast, some academics, American and UN officials, and Iraqi citizens contend that this ignores the consequences of allowing Saddam to continue his policies with no deterrence and unlimited capacity.

Controversy about regional differences
Some commentators blame Saddam Hussein for the excess deaths reported during this period. For example, Rubin argued that the Kurdish and the Iraqi governments handled OFFP aid differently, and that therefore the Iraqi government policy, rather than the sanctions themselves, should be held responsible for any negative effects. Likewise, Cortright claimed: "The tens of thousands of excess deaths in the south-center, compared to the similarly sanctioned but UN-administered north, are the result of Baghdad's failure to accept and properly manage the UN humanitarian relief effort." In the run-up to the Iraq War, some disputed the idea that excess mortality exceeded 500,000, because the Iraqi government had interfered with objective collection of statistics (independent experts were barred).

Other Western observers, such as Matt Welch and  Anthony Arnove, argue that the differences in results noted by authors such as Rubin may have been because the sanctions were not the same in the two parts of Iraq, due to several regional differences: in the per capita money, in war damage to infrastructure and in the relative ease with which smugglers evaded sanctions through the porous Northern borders. Spagat argued in response that "it is hard to believe that these factors could completely overwhelm the major disadvantages of the Kurdish Zone in which perhaps 20% of the population was internally displaced compared to about 0.3% in the South/Centre" and that the Iraq Family Health Survey (IFHS) suggests a higher (albeit declining) child mortality rate in the Kurdistan Region than elsewhere in Iraq during the mid-1990s.

Arguments about the sanctions and the Iraq War

Some analysts, such as Walter Russell Mead, accepted a large estimate of casualties due to sanctions, but argued that invading Iraq was better than continuing the sanctions regime, since "Each year of containment is a new Gulf War."

Albright interview
On May 12, 1996, Madeleine Albright (then U.S. Ambassador to the United Nations) appeared on a 60 Minutes segment in which Lesley Stahl (referring to the 1995 FAO study) asked her "We have heard that half a million children have died. I mean, that's more children than died in Hiroshima. And, you know, is the price worth it?" and Albright replied "I think this is a very hard choice, but the price, we think the price is worth it." Albright wrote later that Saddam Hussein, not the sanctions, was to blame. She criticized Stahl's segment as "amount[ing] to Iraqi propaganda"; said that her question was a loaded question; wrote "I had fallen into a trap and said something I did not mean"; and regretted coming "across as cold-blooded and cruel". The segment won an Emmy Award. Albright's "non-denial" was taken by sanctions opponents as confirmation of a high number of sanctions related casualties.

Albright addressed the controversy at length in a 2020 memoir: "In fact, the producers of 60 Minutes were duped. Subsequent research has shown that Iraqi propagandists deceived international observers ... Per a 2017 article in the British Medical Journal of Global Health, the data 'were rigged to show a huge and sustained—and largely non-existent—rise in child mortality ... to heighten international concern and so get the international sanctions ended.' ... This is not to deny that UN sanctions contributed to hardships in Iraq or to say that my answer to Stahl's question wasn't a mistake. They did, and it was. ... U.S. policy throughout the 1990s was to prevent Iraq from reconstituting its most dangerous weapons programs. Short of another war, UN sanctions were the best means for doing so."

Iraq Inquiry
The Iraq Inquiry led by Sir John Chilcot examined a February 2003 statement by then-British Prime Minister Tony Blair that "today, 135 out of every 1,000 Iraqi children die before the age of five". The inquiry found that the figure in question was provided to Blair by Secretary of State for International Development Clare Short and the Foreign & Commonwealth Office (FCO) based on the 1999 ICMMS study, but an internal caveat from the FCO and the Department for International Development (DFID) to the effect that the ICMMS was of questionable reliability because it had been "conducted with the Iraqi regime's 'help' and relied on some Iraqi figures" was not communicated to Blair by a 10 Downing Street official. The inquiry noted "The level of child mortality in Iraq estimated by the ICMMS was significantly higher than that estimated by later surveys," citing revised UN "estimates that the under‑five mortality rate in Iraq was 55 per 1,000 in 1989, 46 per 1,000 in 1999, 42 per 1,000 in 2003, and 37 per 1,000 in 2010 (when Mr Blair gave his evidence to the Inquiry)."

Lifting of sanctions
Following the 2003 U.S. invasion, the sanctions regime was largely ended on May 22, 2003 (with certain exceptions related to arms and to oil revenue) by paragraph 10 of UNSC Resolution 1483. In December 2010, the UNSC "voted to return control of Iraq's oil and natural gas revenue to the government on 30 June and to end all remaining activities of the [OFFP]".

Iraq's Chapter VII obligations "concerning the return of Kuwaiti and third-State nationals" were rescinded in June 2013 by Resolution 2107. In December 2021, Iraq's central bank announced that it had paid off its entire debt of $52 billion in war reparations to Kuwait.

Legacy
In a 1998 fatwā, al-Qaeda leader Osama bin Laden cited the sanctions against Iraq as a justification for violence against Americans. Bin Laden stated that the sanctions had caused the deaths of 1 million Iraqis in an effort "to destroy Iraq, the most powerful neighboring Arab state."

In a 2015 article in the journal International Affairs, Francesco Giumelli noted that the UNSC had largely abandoned comprehensive sanctions in favor of targeted sanctions since the mid-1990s, with the controversy over the efficacy and civilian harms attributed to the Iraq sanctions playing a significant role in the change: "The sanctions imposed on Iraq in 1990 covered all goods entering or leaving the entire country, whereas those imposed today are most often directed against individuals or non-state entities, and are more limited in scope. ... The widespread view ... that 500,000 Iraqi children died as a result of UN comprehensive sanctions itself rang the death knell for the perceived utility of comprehensive measures." In a similar vein, Albright herself told an interviewer in 2020 that "we learned in many ways that comprehensive sanctions often hurt the people of the country and don't really accomplish what is wanted in order to change the behavior of the country being sanctioned. So we began to look at something called 'smart sanctions' or 'targeted sanctions.'"

See also
ABCD line
Authorization for Use of Military Force Against Iraq Resolution of 2002
Iraqi no-fly zones conflict
Sanctions against Iran
Sanctions against Syria
United States embargo against Cuba
United States sanctions against China

References

 
Modern history of Iraq
International sanctions
United Nations Security Council resolutions concerning Iraq
1990 introductions
2003 disestablishments
Causes and prelude of the Iraq War
United Nations Security Council sanctions regimes